Chrysops brunneus is a species of deer fly in the family Tabanidae. It is found in the United States.

References

Tabanidae
Insects described in 1903
Diptera of North America